Sebastián Lemba (fl. 1540s) was an early Dominican slave rebel leader who led a prolonged maroon rebellion in the colony of Santo Domingo, (present day Dominican Republic). Born in Africa, a member of the Lemba tribe, hence the name. When Lemba was a young man he was captured and taken to companies in France and Spain around the year 1525, and was eventually transferred to the island of Hispaniola.

Furiously tired of the harsh endurance of slavery, Lemba decided to revolt against the Spanish crown in 1532, which succeeded. Determined to liberate the island from slavery, Lemba engaged in a 15-year long maroon rebellion, which subsequently went down in history as one of the first Maroon activities in the entire Americas.

Origins

Background
While the exact date and place of birth is still unknown, some historians agree that he was born in West Africa and may have been born at some point between 1510 to 1520. 

His mother was of the Lemba tribe, and his father was of the Calembo tribe of the Kongo people, which would explain his surnames.  

At some point around 1525, a young Lemba was captured and brought to the Caribbean island called Hispaniola, during which at the time was governed by Spain as the colony of Santo Domingo, the first colony of the New World.

The island was previously inhabited by the Taínos, an Arawak-speaking indigenous tribe of the Caribbean, for some couple thousands of years. The Tainos called the island Quisqueya and Aytí. They lived mostly in peace, but their peace was often disrupted due to constant harassment from the Caribs, another indigenous tribe. These events transpired so much that by the time of European contact, many of the Taínos were seeking for protection. Their lives change in 1492, when the Italian explorer Christopher Columbus arrived on the island and claimed the island for Spain, to which they renamed it Hispaniola. Relations between the Taíno and the Spanish colonists started off warm, but they quickly soured as the Spanish began to forcibly deprive the natives of their gold, subject them to slavery, and inflicted terror on the population, thereby causing the Tainos to fight back. These resistances from the Taínos continued to intensify, resulting in a series of bloody wars between them and the Spanish colonists.  

Eventually by the beginning of the 1500s, the Taino population was nearly decimated, mostly due to diseases. Warfare, abuse and intermixing with the Spaniards also contributed to their decline. But by this time, Taíno slavery had been outlawed, due to the intervention of Dominican friar, Bartolomé de Las Casas, who instead suggested to the Spanish crown to import enslaved Africans for the labor. This action made Santo Domingo the first colony to do so. 

The first Africans to arrive on the island were known as Black Ladinos. These Christianized Africans, who were completely assimilated into the Spanish culture, were brought into the island to replace the Taínos. But just as with the Taínos, life for the newly arrived Africans in the colony was just as hellish. From being forced into harsh labor on the plantations, having absolutely no rights or freedom, and having to endure racial animosity was a nightmarish experience. This pushed them enough to escape from the plantations, while others planned to stage an uprising. 

On December 25, 1521, Maria Olofa and Gonzalo Mandinga, a romantic couple, led the first major slave revolt in the Americas. This revolt lasted for a year until being brutally crushed by the Admiral in December 1522. Laws were introduced to prevent more rebellions and uprising from transpiring, even enforcing harsh punishments on those who wished to stage another revolt. But unfortunate for the Spaniards, many of the slaves successfully escaped to establish independent Maroon communities. This revolt laid the foundation of rebellions on the island, which in turn would result in more uprisings to transpire not only in the island, but the entire Americas.

Life as a slave
Lemba, who had been captured by the Spanish, arrived in the colony to work on the plantations.

Rebellion
Lemba and a group of slaves rose up against the Spanish colony around the year 1532. They escaped and went to the mountainous interior of the island and for several years fought against the Spanish authorities.

Lemba and his group were soon joined by other rebelling slaves. There were estimated to be around 150 and 400 men fighting in the rebellion. Lemba and these men operated like an army. They went throughout villages, ransacking and attacking the Spaniards while liberating other slaves.

Death
Ultimately, on September 25, 1547, Lemba was captured. The circumstances, place and precise date of his death are unclear, however, some sources point to a time period somewhere between 1547 and 1548, in San Juan de la Maguana or elsewhere in the South of the country. But it is also said that he died in Santo Domingo, where he was captured and taken after he was killed in one of the city gates between Fort San pedro and the Puerta del Conde.

Legacy
The actions of Sebastián Lemba have a particular historical significance, as he was one of the first African slaves to begin the fight against slavery throughout the Americas. Lemba is revered as a national hero in the Dominican Republic with a statue in his honor.

References

People of the Colony of Santo Domingo
History of the Dominican Republic
Maroons (people)
16th-century slaves
16th-century rebels
16th-century executions by Spain
16th-century Dominican Republic people
Dominican Republic revolutionaries
1520 births
Year of death unknown
1540s deaths
Slavery in the Spanish Empire
Slavery in the Caribbean

Afro-Dominican (Dominican Republic)
Afro-Caribbean history
Hispanic and Latino